In molecular biology, the interferon gamma receptor (IFNGR1) family is a family of proteins which includes several eukaryotic and viral interferon gamma receptor proteins.

Members of this family include:

The human interferon gamma receptor 1, which is a member of the hematopoietic cytokine receptor superfamily. It is expressed in a membrane-bound form in many cell types, and is over-expressed in tumour cells. It comprises an extracellular portion of 229 amino acid residues, a single transmembrane region, and a cytoplasmic domain of 221 amino acid residues. As with other members of its superfamily, the cytokine-binding sites are formed by a small set of closely spaced surface loops that extend from a beta-sheet core, much like antigen-binding sites on antibodies.
The vaccinia virus interferon (IFN)-gamma receptor (IFN-gammaR), which is a 43 kDa soluble glycoprotein that is secreted from infected cells early during infection. IFN-gammaR from vaccinia virus, cowpox virus and camelpox virus exist naturally as homodimers, whereas the cellular IFN-gammaR dimerises only upon binding the homodimeric IFN-gamma. The existence of the virus protein as a dimer in the absence of ligand may provide an advantage to the virus in efficient binding and inhibition of IFN-gamma in solution.

References

Protein families